Hugo (Danish: Skærmtrolden Hugo) was a children's interactive television show created by the Danish company Interactive Television Entertainment (ITE). Since its premiere on TV2 in 1990, this popular live one-player interactive game show has aired in more than 40 countries. The program's audience callers used their telephones to guide the titular character, a sympathetic small "TV troll" named Hugo, in various simple video-game scenarios to help him an overcome an evil witch and rescue his family, after which the players would be rewarded based on their performance. The show has been adapted into multiple video-game releases and into various merchandise and other media in an extended media and merchandise franchise.

Show 

Hugo, created by Danish company SilverRock Productions, later known as ITE since 1992, was first aired on the Danish television channel TV2 as part of the program Eleva2ren in September 1990, following the earlier success of the company's previous show, OsWALD. The show featured a video game that was remotely played by a contestant via telephone connection. A player randomly chosen from among the callers would be tasked with controlling the titular cartoon character on the TV screen by pressing digit keys on the phone (either 1,2, 3 or 2, 4, 6) which represented different character actions or storyline options. It was targeted for the children audience between the ages of four to 14. (Target age was alternatively presented as 2-12 and varied depending on the country in licensed content, for example 6–16 in Portugal and 6–14 in Vietnam, with some family or even adult editions.) The original show Skærmtrolden Hugo ("Hugo the Screen Troll") proved to be an instant hit, achieving extremely high average TV ratings of 42%, and aired continuously on TV2 for five years. Since then, Hugo has been licensed to more than 40 (43 as of 2007) TV shows around the world, beginning with the Spanish and French versions in 1992. Many international viewers believed that the program was native to their countries, as Hugo spoke Danish only in Denmark's original version.

Story and gameplay 

The show's first season, which ran on Danish television for a year, featured only the titular cartoonish character placed in a computer-animated world. The protagonist Hugo was a friendly and small, yet brave and resourceful, cheerful Scandinavian troll of 220 years (which is still a young age for a troll), who would navigate a maze in a dangerous old goldmine in a quest for hidden treasure, his movements controlled by the player through a press-button telephone. The first season introduced how the in-game Hugo would often communicate with the player to comment on the game's progress (in addition to the commentary by the show's live hosts observing in the studio), as well as to feature a variety of other animated cutscenes including humorous death scenes. In the next season, the show was vastly expanded for a new adventure, adding Hugo's 180-year-old beloved wife Hugolina (Hugoline) and their three kids: Rit (TrolleRit), Rat (TrolleRat), and Rut (TrolleRut, Ruth in some countries), who were aged between 20 (toddler) and 50 (little child). Also added was Hugo's iconic archenemy, the beautiful but hateful and cruel ancient witch that would become intentionally best known as Scylla, but originally was named Afskylia in Denmark (with several alternative names in foreign-language editions, such as Hexana in German, Maldicia in Spanish, Maldiva in Portugaese, Mordana in Croatian, Bosnian and Slovenian, Skylla and Tarastella in Finnish, Cadı Sila in Turkish, and Simla in Vietnamese). The dreaded menace of the realm of Trollwood and beyond, she constantly kept kidnapping Hugo's family for him to try to rescue them and defeat her. The following editions gradually expanded on this concept to involve more characters of good (Hugo's friends) and evil (Scylla's minions) talking and humanoid or regular animals. Nevertheless, Scylla remained the only (not counting the original scenario's old miner) in-game human character to be met within the game's fantastic take on modern Denmark. (Many human characters were later featured in the 2000s Agent Hugo reboot game series set in an alternative hi-tech world.)

The globally familiar standard content and basic rules of subsequent Hugo programs have been established by the vastly expanded second season of the original Danish show in 1991. The objective of the show became guiding the on-screen Hugo through a given a series of game scenarios, each made of an either two-dimensional (side-scrolling) or pseudo three-dimensional (seen from behind Hugo) level. Hugo has to keep constantly moving by various means (for example, riding a snowboard or flying a biplane through a thunderstorm) while avoiding obstacles in his way and surviving Scylla's physical traps and magic spells in order to reach his captive family in the witch's lair before running out of his three lives. All scenarios were composed of many Dragon's Lair style, albeit more repetitive but less scripted, quick time events requiring the caller to press the correct button in time. A failure to avoid any of the dangers caused the loss of one of Hugo's lives and play a relevant cutscene showing Hugo dying or being otherwise stopped in a cartoonish way, often uttering a sarcastic line to comment on this. While progressing through a level, the players were given an opportunity to collect the scattered treasure (initially mostly bars and bags of gold) to increase their scores, which decreased upon picking up rocks (this and some other mistakes were marked a sinister laugh of Scylla, watching Hugo through her magic ball and occasionally reacting to his progress in her own cutscenes). The game-over state could be further triggered by running out of time (usually represented by either some sort of a deadly peril constantly chasing Hugo, such as an avalanche or a flood, or by his remaining amount of fuel or oxygen) or by entering an incorrect password-like puzzle sequence at the end of some levels (the latter required the players to first discover and memorize the solution, presented in the form of a particular set of three symbols randomised for each session, and then to enter it correctly). Failing in any of such cases would make the game end instantly, no matter how many lives have remained in reserve. Several scenarios also required the player to use a map of the level (with the time countdown continuing) and keep choosing correctly between alternating paths as to avoid eventually reaching a dead end instead of arriving at an entry to the witch's hideout after successfully completing the level.

During the course of his adventures, Hugo often gave various messages directly to the players, encouraging them with his rhyming catchphrases while breaking the fourth wall. The most iconic of such cutscenes involved the illusion of Hugo knocking on the TV screen from the inside. when on his last life, and a similar animation of Scylla scratching the screen with her nails before taunting the player about Hugo being hopeless against her. Television hosts meanwhile also cheered on the callers, as would the live audience if any such were present. After finishing the main game by either winning or losing (only winning in some versions), the number of score points determine the value of the real-world prizes to be awarded to the player, which were calculated depending on the amount of gold and other valuables collected along the way, with any lost lives negatively impacting the score. Such prizes varied widely in the different programs across the world. (In Poland, for example, even just the participation-award items were already valuable.)

A potential large bonus awaited those who successfully reached the end of the given scenario(s), during the iconic final scene in which Hugo had arrived at his destination and now stood face-to-face with the terrible witch Scylla. She would present Hugo a set of hanging ropes next to his abducted family watching from their cage, and now the player had to choose between  three or four options, where sheer luck determined both whether the troll family could be rescued and the witch's fate. Depending on which rope were pulled, either Hugo managed to both liberate his family and decisively defeat Scylla (who would be magically tied up and gotten rid of with the help of a spring launcher device in the game-winning best outcome), she would still triumph in the end after all  (capturing Hugo and disposing of him in the same way in an alternative game over losing state), or the family would be freed but with Scylla getting away (turning herself into a bird to escape safely in the canonical happy end); some version would also have the witch lose her youth and beauty and become a hideous old hunchback. Accordingly, the score was doubled (tripled in some versions), halved (erased completely in some versions), or left at its current state (doubled in some versions). Usually several people would attempt this task to win the prize during the typical half an hour of airtime. Over the next years, not only various new scenarios, but also alternative end scenes have been added to the show (and consequently also to its video-game adaptation series), one of them was no longer chance-based and involving Hugo having to steal the key to Scylla's treasure chamber while avoiding her lightning bolt spells. 

A new program format titled Hugo: Jungle Island (Hugo Vulkanøen) premiered in Denmark in January 1999, replacing the content of all the Hugo programs from that point (usually still as Hugo, with the subtitle Jungle Island limited to its video-game adaptations). Its set changed from the familiar magical woods of northern Europe to a remote and exotic island somewhere along the coast of Peru, where Scylla has moved after once again abducting Hugo's family and built a new home for herself on the top of a volcano located in the center of the island. The various ways leading there were as always full of traps, and now also populated by pirates loyal to the witch and infested with stupid and mean monkeys that she sends after Hugo. It featured all-different main scenarios and end scenes, with diamonds replacing gold as score items, as well as introducing several new major characters such as Scylla's devoted chief henchman Don Croco and Hugo's local talking-animal helpers and guides Fernando and Jean Paul. As before, the game ended with the chance-based final confrontation with Scylla, featured in two different versions (choosing the correct magic elixir or pulling the correct lever), but with both of them this time having only two possible outcomes: Hugo would either fail entirely or he would sneakily free his family and capture the witch, with no middle result. One particular Jungle Island scenario, set inside Scylla's weird magic mirror world from the 2002 video game Hugo: The Evil Mirror, was aired in some select countries such as Poland.

Production

Hugo was created by animator Niels Krogh Mortensen after ITE founder Ivan Sølvason commissioned him to design a new game for Eleva2ren to replace OsWALD. The troll's character was originally portrayed by Michael Brockdorf, who developed the voice while serving in the Danish Army. Several others have since taken over the role of voicing the character, including Amin Jensen and Torben Simonsen. Hugolina was originally voiced by Louise Engell (whose brother, Thomas Engell, composed the music for the show). Engell's mother Winnie was the original voice of the antagonist Scylla, whose visual design was modeled after Hugo producer Sølvason's aunt Vivi Feltman. The game's early pixel graphics were created by Mortensen assisted by his brother Lars with Deluxe Paint. The expanding company would keep developing the show's gameplay and basic assets, as well as computer hardware to run it on, for more than decade. The rest of the content for each of the licensed programs, however, were produced locally by various companies in other countries.

For Hugo and its related television program projects, ITE made the custom-built computer system named ITE 3000, able to convert telephone signals into control commands for the characters in the game, allowing the callers to remotely interact with the action on TV from their homes during the live broadcast. This complex and difficult to use system was based on two Amiga 3000 computers combined with a new audio control system, MIDI sampler, DTMF system, and other hardware, all of which reportedly cost $100,000. Special versions had to be modified to fit the telephone systems in some countries such as Spain. ITE 3000 was later replaced by the PC-based ITE 4000, which used a real-time motion capture Animation Mask System (AMS). The new system was invented by Bjarne Sølvason (father of Ivan) and could transfer an actor's body, head, eye movements, and facial expressions to Hugo's character on screen. The actor providing the voice of Hugo wore a helmet containing sensors that would capture his facial expressions and translate them to the character, however, all of the characters' body movements have been pre-rendered in advance. In 1996, ITE created a 3D graphics system for Hugo using Silicon Graphics' Onyx Reality Engine. A new technology for the real-time 3D animation of Hugo was unveiled in 2005, but was aimed only for export, specifically to Asian countries.

List of programs

Local versions

Argentina
In Argentina, Magic Kids' A Jugar Con Hugo, hosted by the popular presenter Gabriela "Gaby" Royfe, ran for seven seasons (343 episodes), winning a Martín Fierro Award for "Best Kids Show" in 2003. The program was produced by Promofilm, and its cast included Carlos Burgos (classic scenario), César Ledesma (1999 - April 2002) and Cristian Bello (until the end of the program) as Hugo, and Roxana Pulido as both Hugolina and Scylla. A paper magazine was also published for the show. In 2016, Gaby Royfe returned to host the program again, this time using the Internet and a mobile app instead of the original television and landline telephone. This 30th anniversary event was attended in-person by an audience of 1,600 and was watched by half million people on TV.

Bosnia and Herzegovina
In Bosnia and Herzegovina, Hugo was aired on the country's public federal channel where it was hosted by Emela Burdžović, Mario Drmać and Elvir Hadžijamaković. Its voice cast included Mirela Lambić as Hugolina.

Brazil
In Brazil, the Hugo show on CNT Gazeta (later Hugo Game) peaked at 500% above the expected rating level, with the record of 1.8 million callers in a single day, resulting in fires at two overwhelmed telephone exchange offices. The program was directed by Herbert Richards and hosted by Mateus Petinatti and Vanessa Vholker, who were later replaced by Andréa Pujol and Rodrigo Brassoloto. Hugo was presented as a duende and played by an animatronic puppet (later only appearing on the studio screens) voiced by Orlando Viggiani.

Chile
In Chile, Hugo was a success and was quickly extended from a 15-minute segment to 30 minutes in the latter half of 1995, before eventually receiving a daily one-hour time slot on Televisión Nacional de Chile (TVN) as La Hora de Hugo ("The Hour of Hugo"). Winners of the daily editions would meet in a weekend grand finale, and the journalist van called Hugomovil ('Hugomobile') traveled around Santiago to interview the program's participants. The show was initially hosted by Ivette Vergara until her pregnancy and then by Andrea Molina, with Sandro Larenas voicing Hugo and the opening theme song performed by Willy Sabor (Guillermo Andrés González Bravo). A similar format was used in the program Sega Acción.

China 
In the People's Republic of China, Hugo was known as a "European troll". The show could not be broadcast live, and consequently also played remotely, because a 30-second delay was required by the authorities to cut off the feed in case if anyone said anything negative about the government.

Croatia 
In Croatia, the show run for eight years between 1996 and 2004 on the public Croatian Radiotelevision (HRT). Croatian Hugo was highly popular, in particular during the late 1990s at the time when it enjoyed an average viewership of 800,000. The program was presented by Boris Mirković, Ivana Plechinger and Kristijan Ugrina, with Hugo voiced by Ivo Rogulja. Its particularly iconic part was the taunt of Mordana (Scylla), Hajde, izaberi jedan broj, sigurno ćeš pogriješiti! ("Go on, choose a number, you will surely fail!").

Finland
In Finland, where Hugo was introduced by game journalist-turned-producer Jussi-Pekka Kossila after he saw it Denmark in 1992, two different 30-minute Hugo shows were aired at the same time by Yle TV2, one for adults and one for children, achieving an 18% market share by 1996. The programs were originally presented by Taru Valkeapää (1993–94), who was chosen from among 45 candidates, and later by Marika Saukkonen, with Hugo voiced by Harri Hyttinen and Skylla (Scylla) voiced by Eija Ahvo. Even after the game show had ended, Hugo's character would continue to appear a host of an educational program. Finnish Hugo merchandise included a music CD release DJ Hugo with dance hits of 1993.

France
In France, the program was called Hugo Délire ("Hugo Madness") and Les Délires d'Hugo ("Hugo Delusions") and was hosted on France3 by Karen Cheryl, with the actor Philippe Bruneau voicing Hugo. Hugo Délire was produced by the company Tilt Productions (later Adventure Lines Productions, founded in 1972 by Jacques Antoine), garnered an average of 25,000 participants per evening, the figure that might have climbed to 40,000 at the peak of its popularity when it was amassing up to 6 million simultaneous viewers. The show achieved cult status among French children of the 1990s.

Germany
In Germany, Austria, and Switzerland (the most significant program being in Germany), Die Hugo-Show, scored with techno music, would draw up to 200,000 phone calls every day at its peak, achieving a 40% viewer share in its target age of 3–13 with its audience of 700,000 in Germany. It used a virtual reality-like studio and the "Hugomobile" van for live gameplay broadcasting all around the country in the Das Hugo-Mobil edition, becoming a cult show. The German version of Hugo won a Golden Cable award in 1995 for "Best Children's Program". Several celebrity musician guests occasionally appeared the show, including Masterboy. German presenters included Minh-Khai Phan-Thi, Yvette Dankou, Tania Schleef and Judith Hildebrandt. Sonja Zietlow hosted the spin-off program Hugo & Hexana. The German show run for the total of 861 episodes, at first hour-long, then half-hour, and eventually just 10-minute. Hugo's voice actor was originally Michael Habeck, followed by Oliver Grimm, Oliver Baier and Sven Blümel, while Karen Kernke voiced Hexana (German name for Scylla). In December 1996, Hugo-Show was replaced by the Kabel 1 program titled Hugo im Hexana-Schloss ("Hugo in Hexana's Castle"). The  castle was a virtual studio that could represent different rooms where, instead of a team of presenters, the show was hosted only by the virtual troll (sometimes described in Germany as a kobold) Hugo and the live-action version of the evil witch Hexana, played by Julia Haacke. It was broadcast only on Saturday mornings in several episodes of ten minutes each between cartoon series. The spin-off Hexana was derived from this show, sponsored by PlayStation with the sub-title "Club PlayStation". There was a German Hugo magazine and a wide variety of merchandise, including numerous music CD releases.

Ireland 
In Ireland, Hiúdaí (the Irish name for Hugo) won the Oireachtas TV awards' "TV Presenter of the Year" in 2001 and "Personality of the Year" in 2004.

Israel
In Israel, Hugo (הוגו) began as a 30-minute show on the Arutz HaYeladim (Children's Channel) and quickly became the channel's most popular show. The show inspired a three-hour spin-off, Hugo's World (עולמו של הוגו), in 1996, in which children used a large step-on number pad to enter character movements. From 1997 to 2001, Hugo starred in a children's electricity safety campaign by Israel Electric Corporation. The show offered a contest related to this campaign in 1997. The program's presenters included Tal Berman. In addition to various merchandise, the show was adapted into a comic book series and a musical stage show.

Poland
In Poland, the main Hugo show and a spin-off aired on Saturday, while another spin-off aired Monday through Friday. All of these programs were shown on the Polsat network, being filmed at first in the Informacje (a precedessor of Wydarzenia) news program's weather room before being moved to a blue box studio. The content was originally modeled after the German version of the show, and later developed in cooperation with the company Cenega publishing the localized Hugo video games in Poland. The main program spawned two spin-offs: Hugo Family (running from 2002 to 2006) where entire families competed in the show featuring puzzles rather than action sequences and without the final endgames, and Hugo Express (launched in 2003) airing on workdays without hosts and endgames. Hugo was the most popular children's program in Poland for several years,  with the country's "Hugomania" lasting between 2002 and 2006. During this period, an episode would watched by between two-and-half and three million Polish viewers at the peak of the show's popularity. Hugo was originally hosted by Wojciech Asiński and Andrzej Krucz, later (2005 to 2009) replaced by Piotr Galus, while Aleksandra Woźniak hosted Hugo Family. The character of Hugo was originally voiced by Andrzej Niemirski and later by Mariusz Czajka. Similar to as in Germany, there was a long-running monthly (later bi-monthly) children's magazine with a coloring-book spin-off magazine, in addition to various kinds of locally produced merchandise such as food products.

Portugal
In Portugal, the show's presenters included Alexandra Cruz, Fernando Martins, Pedro Mendonça, Pedro Pinto, Joana Seixas and Susana Bento Ramos, and the voice actors included Frederico Trancoso (Hugo), Grace Ferreira (Hugolina), and Mónica Garcez (Maldiva/Scylla). Hugo won a Troféu Nova Gente award in 1999. The show was ended by Emilío Rangel as soon as he became the RTP1 director, but was later revived on RTP2 as the daily programs Hora H - Hugo e os amigos ("H Hour - Hugo and his friends") in 2000 and Hugo, o Regresso ("Hugo, the Return") in 2001.

Russia 
Позвоните Кузе ("Call Kuzya") was the first interactive program in the history of Russian television, hosted on RTR-2 by Inna Gomes and Andrei Fedorov. Hugo was renamed to Kuzya (Кузя, possibly after Kuzya the Little Domovoi, the hero of a classic Soviet cartoon series). He was voiced by Aleksander Lenkov and Dmitry Polonsky, while Scylla was voiced by Aleksandra Ravenskih.

Slovenia 
In Slovenia, the Hugo show was hosted by Gregor Krajc (who later became a major politician) on TV Slovenija. It became the country's #1 entertainment show by 1996, reaching 38% viewer share among its target demographic.

South Africa 
Hugo never aired in South Africa because the local TV station involved in licensing negotiations demanded that ITE remove horns in all animations for all games, as their superstitious viewers believed that Hugo would appear as a demon from local beliefs. (Hugo's horns also caused problems in the Middle East.)

Spain
In Spain, a quarter of the TV watchers tuned in to watch Hugo hosted by Carmen Sevilla as part of the program Telecupón on Telecinco, a viewing figure that has remained unsurpassed since 1994. Pepe Carabias (José Carabias Lorenzo) voiced Hugo in Spain. The success of the show prompted the launch of Hugolandia, a standalone program presented by Beatriz Rico, Luis Alberto Vazquez, and Roma and Eva Morales and directed by Sebastian Junyent.

Sweden 
In Sweden, the TV4 version of the Hugo show became the best-rated children's show of all time in 1996. The show's merchandise included a board game based on it.

Turkey
In Turkey, Hugo became the highest ranking children's show and achieved a 12% share of the total market at the time when the country was new to private TV channels. The program was enormously popular, especially at the beginning in 1993 when it was being watched by millions of children, thousands of whom would compete to play as callers. The show was primarily hosted by Tolga Gariboğlu for over a decade. There was also a Hugo-themed theatrical show and a collection of locally made merchandise. In the Turkish version, Scylla (cadı Sila, was voiced by Eylem Şenkal) kidnapped Hugo's family to fulfill her desire to gain eternal beauty by drinking their sweat obtained from being worked to death, a motif not mentioned in the other versions. An often repeated urban legend tells of a boy shouting obscenities at both Hugo and the show's host Tolga upon losing in his game before being cut off, with many claiming having witnessed this aired on live television, although such incident has been denied by Tolga himself and there is no record of it.

United Kingdom 
In the UK, Hugo was played on What's Up Doc? and The Shiny Show, reaching up to 38% viewer share on the latter.

Vietnam
In Vietnam, the show was first aired in 2004 with the title Vui cùng Hugo ("Fun with Hugo") on Ho Chi Minh City Television (HTV). It was hosted by Ngoc Linh and Thanh Thao, with Hugo voiced by Quach Ho Ninh. Since December 2005, a Northern version of the show has been aired on Hanoi Radio Television along with the HTV version. It was called Hugo và các bạn ("Hugo and friends") and was hosted by Hoàng Thùy Linh, Lê Đức Anh (Đức Anh Hugo), Nguyen Thanh Vân (Thanh Vân Hugo) and Thu Hằng. The show became one of the highest rated shows in Vietnam by 2008, receiving an average of 20,000 phone calls per episode and up to 500,000 weekly at the peak. The program became a household name and a favorite among both children and adults. Hugo và các bạn was axed in 2008 as a part of Hanoi TV's mass gameshow cancellation, with almost every such program made by the station being discontinued and replaced with HTV gameshows and a movie block.

Other media and merchandise

Various video games, including a series directly adapted from the 1990s show, and other media and licensed merchandise have been produced in Denmark to be distributed around the world. There have been also two attempts to adapt the show into an animated film, among various other developments. By the 2018 estimate of former Hugo producer Ivan Sølvason, there have been a total of some 6,500 different Hugo products worldwide.

References

1990 Danish television series debuts
1995 Danish television series endings
1990s American children's game shows
1990s British game shows
Austrian television shows
Bosnia and Herzegovina television shows
Brazilian television shows
British children's game shows
Children's game shows
Chilean game shows
Chinese game shows
Colombian television shows
Croatian game shows
Finnish game shows
French game shows
German game shows
Danish game shows

Interactive television
Irish game shows
Israeli game shows
ITV game shows
Malaysian game shows
Mexican game shows
Norwegian game shows
Polish game shows
Portuguese television shows
Romanian television shows
Russian game shows
Serbian game shows
Slovenian television shows
Spanish game shows
Swedish game shows
Swiss television shows
Telemundo original programming
Thai game shows
Turkish game shows
Venezuelan television shows
Vietnamese television shows
Witchcraft in television